Ekaterina Viktorovna Bankerova (born 6 November 1989 in Leningrad ) is a Russian rugby union player, defender on the Krasny Yar team, and the Russian national rugby sevens team. She was 2013 Universiade champion, and 2014 European champion. She was awarded the Master of Sports of Russia of international class.

Career 
She joined the Russian national rugby sevens team in 2012; she participated in the 2013 World Cup in Moscow, in the 2013 Summer Universiade in Kazan, and in the 2013  European Championship and 2014  European Championship, both times she won.

She competed at the 2013 Rugby World Cup Sevens. In 2016, she competed at the  World Rugby Women's Sevens Series.

In 2015, Ekaterina was the bronze medalist of the 2015 Rugby Europe Women's Trophy, held in Switzerland; in 2016, she won the bronze at the 2016 Rugby Europe Women's Championship in Spain. She won her third bronze medal at the 2019 Rugby Europe Women's Championship.

References

External links 
 Ekaterina Bankerova (L) of Russia vies for the ball with Ano Kuwai of Japan during their World Rugby Women's Sevens Series match

1989 births
Russian rugby union players
Russian rugby sevens players
Living people